The Benjamin Aldrich Homestead is a historic homestead east of the terminus of Aldrich Road, slightly east of Piper Hill in Colebrook, New Hampshire.  Developed beginning in 1846, it is the oldest surviving farm property in the town.  Its farmstead includes the original 1846 house and barns of the period.  It was listed on the National Register of Historic Places in 2003, and the New Hampshire State Register of Historic Places in 2002.

Description and history
The Benjamin Aldrich Homestead stands in a rural area of northwestern Colebrook, on a hillside of  overlooking the Connecticut River to the west.  The farmstead includes the main house, several barns, a chicken coop, and other storage buildings.  The main block of the main house is a -story wood-frame structure, with a gabled roof, granite stone foundation, and Greek Revival decoration.  Attached to it is an older -story Cape, now serving as an ell on the south side.  The main barn, built about the same time as the ell, is a bank barn with a fieldstone foundation and hand-hewn timber frame.

The ell of the house and the barn were built in 1846 and 1847, respectively, not long after Benjamin Aldrich's purchase of the land in 1844.  In 1861, the main block of the house was built, and the old house rotated and attached to its south side.  The farm is the last intact 19th-century farmstead in the town of Colebrook.  It remained in the hands of Aldrich's descendants until 1988, seeing agricultural use well into the 20th century.  Originally a largely agrarian community, Colebrook has no active farm properties.

See also

National Register of Historic Places listings in Coos County, New Hampshire

References

Houses on the National Register of Historic Places in New Hampshire
Houses in Coös County, New Hampshire
New Hampshire State Register of Historic Places
Houses completed in 1846
National Register of Historic Places in Coös County, New Hampshire
Colebrook, New Hampshire